Natalia Chernova (Russian: Наталья Чернова; born March 6, 1976, in Krasnodar, Russia) is a Russian Olympic trampoline gymnast. She has been competing in international competitions since 1994. In this period she has been to 2 Olympics, 7 World Championships and 7 European Championships. Below is her competition record:

Olympics
Athens 2004 = 4th
Beijing 2008 = 11th

World Championships
2007 Quebec City World Championships = 7th
2005 Eindhoven World Championships = 2nd
2003 Hannover World Championships = 4th
2001 Odense World Championships = 47th
1999 Sun City World Championships = 5th
1998 Sydney World Championships = 10th
1994 Porto World Championships = 54th

European Championships
2008 Odense European Championships = 6th
2006 Metz European Championships = 5th
2004 Sofia European Championships = 9th
2002 St Petersburg European Championships = 1st
2000 Eindhoven European Championships = 5th
1998 Dessau European Championships = 34th
1995 Antibes European Championships = 13th

In addition she is the 4-time Russian Champion taking the title in 1998, 1999, 2000 and 2007. Chernova is 5 ft 2in (158 cm) and currently lives in Krasnodar with her husband German Khnychev who is a one time World and two time European champion himself at trampolining. They have one child together.

References

1976 births
Living people
Russian female trampolinists
Gymnasts at the 2004 Summer Olympics
Gymnasts at the 2008 Summer Olympics
Olympic gymnasts of Russia
Medalists at the Trampoline Gymnastics World Championships
Competitors at the 2001 World Games
World Games gold medalists